Repentigny is an off-island suburb of Montreal, Quebec, Canada. It is located north of the city on the lower end of the L'Assomption River, and on the Saint Lawrence River. Repentigny and Charlemagne were the first towns off the eastern tip of the Island of Montreal. Repentigny is part of the Lanaudière region.

History
It was founded in 1670 by Jean-Baptiste Le Gardeur, son of Seigneur Pierre Le Gardeur. During the town's first 250 years, Repentigny was only inhabited by a few hundred peasants, or habitants, and was an agricultural community. In 1677, the first population census only shows 30 inhabitants. Its first mayor was Benjamin Moreau 1855.

Repentigny merged with its neighbouring city of Le Gardeur on June 1, 2002. The city's area grew from 29 to 69 km2 and the population grew by 70%.

Repentigny was also the western terminus of the Chemin du Roy, a road that extends eastward towards Quebec City.

Demographics 

In 2021, Repentigny was 81.4% white/European, 17.6% visible minorities, and 1.0% Indigenous. The largest visible minority groups were Black (9.9%), Arab (3.3%), and Latin American (2.2%)

85.8% of residents spoke French as their mother tongue. Other common first languages were Spanish (2.3%) Arabic (2.0%), Haitian Creole (1.8%) English (1.7%), Kabyle (0.7%), and Italian (0.6%). 1.6% of residents listed both French and a non-official language as mother tongues while 0.9% of listed both French and English.

70.3% of the population was Christian, down from 89.3% in 2011. 59.0% of residents were Catholic, 6.7% were Christian n.o.s, 1.6% were Protestant and 3.0% belonged to other Christian denominations or Christian-related traditions. Non-religious and secular people made up 23.3% of the population, up from 8.7% in 2011. 6.4% of residents followed other religions and spiritual traditions, up from 1.9% in 2011. The largest non-Christian religion was Islam, at 5.8% of the population.

Transit
Repentigny is the central point for transit in South-Central Lanaudière. Its Centre d'Échange Rive Nord-Est (Northeastern Shore Transit Exchange Centre), administrated by Réseau de transport métropolitain, is the main infrastructure for transit in the region. Unlike a bus terminal, no departures are available from the Centre d'Échange, but transfers from one circuit to the other are possible. 9 of the 10 RTCR de la MRC de L'Assomption transit system circuits travel via Centre d'Échange, in addition to the 2 CRTL regional lines. Thus, Repentigny is directly connected to Terrebonne, Charlemagne, L'Assomption, Montreal, Montréal-Est, Saint-Sulpice, Lavaltrie, Lanoraie, Sainte-Geneviève-de-Berthier, Berthierville, La Visitation-de-l'Île-Dupas, Saint-Ignace-de-Loyola, Saint-Paul-d'Industrie, Crabtree, Sainte-Marie-Salomé and Joliette.

The city of Repentigny takes part in the L'Assomption MRC public transportation network effort and pan-regional Lanaudière Regional Transport Commission, linking all of the Regional County Municipalities of Lanaudière, even the northmost ones. In addition there is the MRC Les Moulins.

Repentigny is connected to Montreal's Central Station by commuter rail via the Repentigny Station of Réseau de transport métropolitain's Mascouche Line.

Education
The Commission scolaire des Affluents operates Francophone public schools:

 Centre de formation professionnelle des Riverains
 Centre la Croisée
 École secondaire Félix-Leclerc (1992)
 École secondaire Jean-Baptiste-Meilleur (1963)
 École secondaire Jean-Claude-Crevier (1948)
 École secondaire l'Envolée (1955)
 École secondaire l'Horizon (1988)
 École primaire Alphonse-Desjardins (1951)
 École primaire de la Paix (1988)
 École primaire des Moissons (1982)
 École primaire du Moulin (1986)
 École primaire Émile-Nelligan (1971)
 École primaire Entramis (1986)
 École primaire Henri-Bourassa et Soleil-de-l'Aube (1966)
 École primaire Jean-Duceppe (1992)
 École primaire Jean-XXIII (1959)
 École primaire la Majuscule (1998)
 École primaire la Tourterelle (1991)
 École primaire le Bourg-Neuf (1989)
 École primaire Longpré (1962)
 École primaire Louis-Fréchette (1965)
 École primaire Louis-Joseph-Huot (1960)
 École primaire Marie-Victorin (1961)
 École primaire Pie-XII (1961)
 École primaire Tournesol (1981)
 École primaire Valmont-sur-Parc (2016)

Sir Wilfrid Laurier School Board operates Anglophone public school:
 Franklin Hill Elementary School in Repentigny (2004)

Notable residents
Julie Brosseau, women's basketball player
Les Cowboys Fringants, a Québécois folk-pop band.
Marie Deschamps, a Canadian Supreme Court Justice.
Benoît Hogue, a former NHL hockey player 
Samuel Piette, a soccer player for CF Montréal
Jason Pominville, a hockey player for the Buffalo Sabres
Pascal Leclaire, a former NHL hockey player 
Marie-Ève Pelletier, a former professional tennis player.
Maxim Lapierre, Pittsburgh Penguins forward.
Solomon Juneau, founder of Milwaukee, the largest city in the US state of Wisconsin
Joseph Juneau, co-founder of Juneau, Alaska
Karl Ouimette, a soccer player for the San Francisco Deltas
Thomas Meilleur-Giguère, a soccer player for CF Montréal

Culture
Repentigny is home of many festivities :
Festival de Feu et de Glace (Festival of Fire and Ice, a winter fest), January–February.
Festival de spectacles jeune-public de Lanaudière (Youth theatre fest), early July.
Rendez-Vous Estival (Summer Rendez-Vous, a theme park with familial activities and rock shows), early August.
Festival Gospel (Gospel Fest, International gospel choirs fest), mid-August.
National de Soccer (Soccer Nationals, 18- level national soccer event), mid-August.
Internationaux de Tennis junior du Canada Banque Nationale (National Bank Junior Tennis Internationals of Canada, the biggest sports event in the city), late August-early September
Fête du Petit-Village (Little town fest, cultural rendez-vous in the old Saint-Paul-l'Ermite sector), every 2 autumns.
The Fête Nationale du Québec, la St-Jean, brings many activities, such as shows and performances on stage in L'île Lebel.
Many outdoor shows and movie projections

See also
 List of cities in Quebec
 Municipal reorganization in Quebec
 North Shore (Montreal)
 Église Notre-Dame-des-Champs de Repentigny

References

External links

Official website 

 
Cities and towns in Quebec
Populated places established in 1670
Quebec populated places on the Saint Lawrence River
1670 establishments in New France